Ellis Sharp is an experimental British writer based in London. Known for his often Surrealist style, Sharp's work is often littered with obscure literary and historical references. His works include several collections of short stories, and novels The Dump, Unbelievable Things and Walthamstow Central, all released by Zoilus Press. His work has also been published by Jetstone, New Ventures and Malice Aforethought Press, which was founded by Frank Key and Max Décharné. The dedication of Sharp’s Twenty-Twenty reads "In memory of Frank Key" and the book includes reminiscences of Key.

Sharp's influences include Ann Quin, who is referenced in his collection Quin Again and Other Stories (2015). He also has an essay about Quin's last published novel Tripticks in his collection Sharply Critical (2017).

The novel Complicity by Iain Banks is dedicated to Sharp.

Sharp was born and brought up in Sussex, but now lives in London. He is said to shun publicity and has been described as a 'recluse'.

Publications

The Aleppo Button (1991) – stories
Lenin's Trousers (1992) – stories
Engels on Video: A Joint Production (1995) – stories; with Mac Daly
To Wanstonia (1996) – stories
The Dump (1998) – novel
Driving My Baby Back Home (1996) – stories
Unbelievable Things (2000) – novel
Aria Fritta (2004) – stories
Walthamstow Central (2007) – novel
Dead Iraqis: Selected Short Stories of Ellis Sharp (New Ventures, 2009) – stories
Intolerable Tongues (2011) – novel
Quin Again and Other Stories (Jetstone, 2015) – stories
The Writer in Nicholas Royle (ed), The Best British Short Stories 2013 (Salt, 2013)
To Wetumpka (2015) – novel
Lamees Najim (Jetstone, 2015) – novel
Sharply Critical: Selected Essays and Reviews (Jetstone, 2017)
The Orwell Girl (2020) - novel
Neglected Writer (2021) - novel
What Vronsky Did Next (2021) - novel
Twenty-Twenty (2021) - novel
Alice in Venice (2022) - novel

References

20th-century English novelists
21st-century English novelists
Year of birth missing (living people)
Place of birth missing (living people)
Living people